The 1997–98 Slovenian PrvaLiga season started on 3 August 1997 and ended on 7 June 1998. Each team played a total of 36 matches.

League table

Relegation play-offs

Beltinci won 5–1 on aggregate.

Domžale won 4–2 on aggregate.

Results
Every team plays four times against their opponents, twice at home and twice on the road, for a total of 36 matches.

First half of the season

Second half of the season

Top goalscorers

See also
1997–98 Slovenian Football Cup
1997–98 Slovenian Second League

References
General

External links
Official website of the PrvaLiga 

Slovenian PrvaLiga seasons
Slovenia
1997–98 in Slovenian football